Professor Balthazar is a Croatian animated television series for children about an old inventor that was produced between 1967 and 1978. It was created by animator Zlatko Grgić.

The series revolves around benevolent genius Professor Balthazar. In each episode, someone in his surroundings has a problem, which he duly considers and invariably finds a solution to. He then activates a magical machine and produces an invention that will solve the problem.

The characters of the series do not speak in any intelligible language, and the plot of the episodes is instead recounted by a narrator in voice-over.

History
The series was created for television by the Croatian animator Zlatko Grgić at the Zagreb Film studio.  Fifty-nine episodes of the cartoon were made between 1967 and 1978.

The cartoon has been shown in subsequent years in several countries besides the former Yugoslavia, including Denmark, Finland, Germany (Westdeutscher Rundfunk), Iran, Italy, Norway, Portugal, South Korea, Sweden and Israel.  Also, Canada, France, Greece, the Netherlands, New Zealand, Romania, Spain, United Kingdom and Zimbabwe.

The likely source of the cartoon's popularity is the general absence of violence or force as a means of solving problems. The professor himself is depicted as benevolent and pacifistic, always aiming to solve problems through imagination and reason, as well as ensuring that everyone ends up better off.

From 1971 to 1973, episodes were featured on the American ABC-TV children's program Curiosity Shop. The cartoon inventor was the basis for the show's puppet character, Baron Balthazar, and the cartoons were shown as animated sequences of the Baron's tales of his adventures and inventions back in "beautiful downtown Bosnia".

The cartoon was also shown in the United States in the 1980s on Pinwheel as well as on ABC in Australia and on CCTV in China. The cartoon was also shown in Asia in the 1990s on STAR TV.

In 2011, all 59 episodes have been restored by DVDlab, and published on DVD. A new episode was produced in 2019, "Third time lucky", 52 years after the original show premiered.

Credits
Production Company: Zagreb / Windrose-Hamburg for WWF-Cologne
Production Supervisor: Z. Pavičić
Scripts: Zlatko Grgić, Boris Kolar, Ante Zaninović
Directors: Zlatko Grgić, Boris Kolar, Ante Zaninović
Animators: Zlatko Grgić, Boris Kolar, Ante Zaninović, T. Paus, L. Fabiani, N. Petrick, S. Drobnić
Backgrounds: Zlatko Bourek, Branko Varadin, Srdjan Matić
Camera: I. Hercigonja
Music: Tomica Simović
Music Supervisor: T. Brunšmid
Sound: M. Presil
Designers: Zlatko Grgić, Boris Kolar, Ante Zaninović

Episodes

Season 1
(Order and titles according to region 2 DVD)
 The Inventor Of Shoes - May 15, 1967
 The Flying Fabian - October 10, 1968
 A Windy Story
 Maestro Koko - October 10, 1968
 Of Mouse And Ben - June 20, 1969
 Starlight Serenaders
 The Rise And Fall Of Horatio - June 20, 1969
 Martin Makes It To The Top - June 20, 1969
 Knitting Pretty
 Arts And Flowers
 Lighthouse Keeping - June 20, 1969
 Victor's Egg-O-Matic
 Happiness For Two

Season 2 
(Order and titles according to region 2 DVD)
 Doctor Don't Little - December 31, 1970
 The Night Watchman Must Fall - December 31, 1970
 Cloud And Clear
 Steepless Is Fynny
 Bald Is Beautiful
 Stumble-Bumps
 Snow Time For Comedy - December 31, 1970
 Bim Bam Bum
 The Grave Little Tailor - December 31, 1970
 Some Like It Hop
 For Heaven's Cake
 Some Like It Cold
 Somewhat Over The Rainbow

Season 3
(Order and titles according to region 2 DVD)
 Maxol - January 1, 1977
 Water We Doing - January 1, 1977
 Hat-On Flier - January 1, 1977
 Cloudy With Brawlstorms - January 1, 1977
 Pirates And Lollipops - January 1, 1977
 Two Bees Or Not Two Bees - January 1, 1977
 You're Fired! - January 1, 1977
 Big-Saw Puzzle - January 1, 1977
 Vanilla Monster - January 1, 1977
 Lion's Share - January 1, 1977
 Tenderfeet Centipede - January 1, 1977
 Peppino Cicerone - January 1, 1977
 Mike On The Bike - January 1, 1977

Season 4
(Order and titles according to region 2 DVD)
 Crazy Times
 Heart On Fire
 The Sad Little Ghost
 Two Top Hats
 Dancing Willy Hik
 Playing Tag
 The Lost Rabbit
 Clown Daniel
 Abraham The Busy Shoemaker
 Opera Star
 Axel The Penguin
 Business Is Business
 Bird
 Sporting Life
 Champion
 Street Musicians
 The Great Snoring
 The Trials Of Love
 Happiness On Wings
 An Endless Deviltry

References

External links

EOFFTV: Production information and list of episodes (episode names in Croatian)
Detailed list of all series: https://web.archive.org/web/20110215163311/http://www.zagrebfilm.hr/baltazar_list_e.asp
Professor Balthazar's official youtube page
Professor Balthazar restored version 4DVDbox

Yugoslav culture
1967 Yugoslav television series debuts
1977 Yugoslav television series endings
Croatian children's television series
Croatian animated television series
1960s animated television series
1970s animated television series
1960s Yugoslav television series
1970s Yugoslav television series
Zagreb Film films
Balthazar
Balthazar
Balthazar
Fictional Yugoslav people
Fictional Croatian people